Franklin James Kreutzer (born February 7, 1939) is an American former Major League Baseball pitcher who appeared in 78 games over all or part of six seasons with the Chicago White Sox (–) and Washington Senators (1964– and ).

That November, he was selected by the White Sox in the first-year player draft then in force. He made his MLB debut on September 20, 1962, throwing 1 innings of shutout relief against the Red Sox at Comiskey Park. He also pitched for the White Sox in 18 other contests through July 15, 1964. Thirteen days later, he was the "player to be named later" to complete a July 13 deal in which Chicago acquired first baseman Bill Skowron from Washington for Joe Cunningham.

The  campaign was Kreutzer's only full season in the majors. His best career outing came on July 2 of that year, when he threw a three-hit, ten-strikeout complete game shutout against the Detroit Tigers while hitting a two-run home run of his own. The Senators triumphed, 6–0.

Of Kreutzer's 78 big-league games, 32 were starts; the July 1965 shutout of the Tigers was his only white-washing as a big leaguer. He posted an 8–18 career won–lost mark, one save, two complete games, and a 4.40 earned run average. In 210 innings pitched, he permitted 194 hits and 109 bases on balls, with 151 strikeouts.

References

External links
, or Retrosheet, or Pelota Binaria (Venezuelan Winter League)

1939 births
Living people
Baseball players from Buffalo, New York
Buffalo Bisons (minor league) players
Cardenales de Lara players
American expatriate baseball players in Venezuela
Chicago White Sox players
Columbus Jets players
Florida Instructional League Senators players
Hawaii Islanders players
Indianapolis Indians players
Major League Baseball pitchers
Richmond Braves players
Texas Rangers players
Villanova Wildcats baseball players
Washington Senators (1961–1971) players
Winston-Salem Red Sox players
St. Joseph's Collegiate Institute alumni